Robert Little may refer to:
 Robert Little (journalist), American journalist for the Baltimore Sun
 Robert Little (minister) (1762–1827), English-American Unitarian minister
 Robert A. Little (1895–1918), Australian pilot
 Rob Little (born 1972), American stand-up comedian and actor
 Robert Little (architect) (1919–2005), modernist architect in Cleveland, Ohio
 Robert Wentworth Little (1840–1878), Freemason
 Robert Little (Flying Tiger) (died 1942), World War II double flying ace

See also
 Robert Littell (disambiguation)